Outrigger canoeing, mostly using va'a canoes, has been contested at the Pacific Games since the 1995 edition held in Papeete, Tahiti. The va'a rudderless outrigger has been raced at all regattas, although the "Galaide II" outrigger canoe with rudder has also been used. Tahiti has dominated the competition since inception, topping the medal count at all regattas the country has attended.

Pacific Games

Editions

Pacific Mini Games

Summary

References

 
Pacific Games
Pacific Games
Canoeing in Oceania